Zhwandun (life), also romanized as Zhvandun, Zhwandon may refer to:

Zhvandūn, a former Afghan magazine that ran from 1949 to 1996
Zhwandoon TV, an Afghan television station